Mangi Dam may refer to:
Mangi Dam, India, Maharashtra, India
Mangi Dam, Pakistan, a dam near Ziarat in Balochistan, Pakistan

See also
Mangi (disambiguation)
Manji (disambiguation)